"New to You" is a song by Scottish DJ and record producer Calvin Harris, American singers Normani and Tinashe and American rapper Offset. It was released on 29 July 2022 through Columbia Records as the fourth single from Harris' sixth studio album, Funk Wav Bounces Vol. 2. The song was written by the artists alongside Jessie Reyez.

Background 
"New to You" marks the second time Harris has teamed up with Tinashe, following their song "Dollar Signs" from his fourth studio album Motion (2014); he also previously teamed up with Normani on the 2018 extended play Normani x Calvin Harris, which contains the songs "Checklist" and "Slow Down"; and previously joined Offset on the Frank Ocean–assisted single "Slide" from his album Funk Wav Bounces Vol. 1 (2017).

Composition 
The song was composed by Harris, alongside Normani, Tinashe, Offset, and singer-songwriter Jessie Reyez.

Musically, "New to You" is a bubbly R&B-inspired post-disco song. Billboard referred to it as "classy orchestral arrangements with glittery disco vibes". The track has also been described as having "a swaying groove, punchy stings and synths leading the way over a slick bass line". It sees Normani singing about seducing a potential love interest with the lyrics "This might be news to you / This thing might feel new to you / But if you like everything / I think you might love me, baby" in the chorus; and Offset rapping about "the effervescent feeling of finding the right person" with lyrics like "I was dead on relationships / You made me feel like living."

Credits and personnel
Credits adapted from Tidal.

 Calvin Harris – production, songwriting, recording, vocal production, mixing
 Normani – vocals, songwriting
 Tinashe – vocals, songwriting
 Offset – vocals, songwriting
 Jessie Reyez – songwriting
 Everton Nelson – violin
 Emil Chakalov – violin
 Hayley Pomfrett – violin
 Lucy Wilkins – violin
 Marianne Haynes – violin
 Charis Jenson – violin
 Tom Pigott-Smith – violin
 Patrick Kiernan – violin
 Ian Humphries – violin
 Perry Montague-Mason – violin
 Richard George – violin
 Warren Zielinski – violin
 Charlie Brown – violin
 John Mills – violin
 Bruce White – viola
 Andy Parker – viola
 Adrian Smith – viola
 Reiad Chibah – viola
 Sara Hajir – cello
 Nick Cooper – cello
 Ian Burdge – cello
 Chris Worsey – cello
 Dave Kutch – mastering
 Kuk Harrell – recording, vocal production, engineering assistance
 JRich ENT – recording
 Stephen Fitzmaurice – recording
 Jelli Dorman – engineering assistance
 Mark Goodchild – miscellaneous production
 Emma Marks – miscellaneous production
 Adele Phillips – miscellaneous production

Charts

References

2022 singles
2022 songs
Calvin Harris songs
Columbia Records singles
Normani songs
Tinashe songs
Offset (rapper) songs
Songs written by Calvin Harris
Songs written by Offset (rapper)
Songs written by Jessie Reyez
Songs written by Normani
Songs written by Tinashe